Gnaeus Domitius Ahenobarbus was a politician of ancient Rome in the 1st century BC. He married Cornelia, daughter of Lucius Cornelius Cinna, who was consul in 87 BC.

In the civil war between Marius and Sulla, Ahenobarbus took the side of the former.  When Sulla obtained the supreme power in 82 BC, Ahenobarbus was proscribed, and fled to Africa, where he was joined by many who were in the same condition as himself.  With the assistance of the Numidian king, Hiarbas, he collected an army, but was defeated in the Battle of Utica by Pompey, whom Sulla had sent against him, and was afterwards killed in the storming of his camp, in 81 BC.  According to some accounts, he was executed after the battle on the orders of Pompey (who was probably acting on Sulla's orders himself).

References

2nd-century BC births
81 BC deaths
Year of birth unknown
Domitii Ahenobarbi
1st-century BC Romans
Ancient Romans killed in action